Ente Mezhuthiri Athazhangal is a 2018 Indian Malayalam-language romantic comedy film directed by Sooraj Tom. It was written by Anoop Menon who also stars in the lead role alongside Miya. The film also features an ensemble supporting cast that includes Dileesh Pothan, Lal Jose, Baiju, Alencier Ley Lopez, V. K. Prakash, Hannah Reji Koshy, Srikant Murali and Nisa NP, The songs featured in the film are composed by M. Jayachandran. Anoop Menon signed Rahul Raj to compose the background score of the movie. The movie was released on 27 July 2018 to theatres and was well acclaimed.

Cast

Music
The film score is composed, arranged and produced by Rahul Raj, while the five songs featured in the film are composed by M. Jayachandran and written by Rafeeq Ahamed.

Release
Ente Mezhuthiri Athazhangal was released on 27 July 2018.

References

External links

2018 films
2010s Malayalam-language films
Indian romantic comedy films
2018 romantic comedy films
Films directed by Sooraj Tom